This is a list of years in Egypt.

16th century

17th century

18th century

19th century

20th century

21st century

See also
 
Cities in Egypt
 Timeline of Cairo
 Timeline of Alexandria
 Timeline of Port Said

Further reading

External links
 

 
Egypt history-related lists
Egypt